The Finder is an American procedural drama television series created by Hart Hanson that ran on Fox from January 12, 2012 to May 11, 2012. The series originally aired on Thursdays at 9:00 pm, and moved to Fridays at 8:00 pm beginning April 6, 2012. It is a spin-off of another Fox television series, Bones, where the backdoor pilot, a season six episode entitled "The Finder", aired in April 2011. It is loosely based on The Locator series of two books ("The Knowland Retribution" and "The Lacey Confession") by Richard Greener. On May 9, 2012, Fox cancelled the series after one season.

Cast and characters
 Geoff Stults as Major Walter Sherman, U.S. Army (retired).  Due to a traumatic brain injury suffered in the Iraq War due to a roadside bomb explosion that only he survived, Walter is paranoid, suspicious and quirky (he also says that he's "not exactly inhibited"), but it also somehow resulted in him now being able to find anything, seeing patterns where others wouldn't.  His brain uses "Walter Math" to explain these things to him.  In the backdoor pilot, in Bones, FBI Special Agent Seeley Booth calls Walter's gift "The Finder Power", while Leo Knox calls it "Darna Shellah" and "Akashvani".  Because of his ability to find anything, a lot of powerful and influential people now owe him favors.  Walter's catchphrase, as such, is "I'mma risk it" where he often makes a decision even after Leo legally advises him otherwise. In the pilot, it is revealed that he and Booth have "history" and knew each other from their days in the Army. He has a habit of sometimes taking before-and-after polaroids of clients.  Walter has the knack of also finding out things that his clients didn't want to know by finding what people are really looking for, not just what they think they're looking for.  According to Walter, in "The Boy with the Bucket", he was named, by his mother, after poet Walt Whitman.  He is depicted as being younger than his literary counterpart, having never been married, nor having any children.  Walter's original literary incarnation served in Vietnam and never suffered brain damage.  
 Michael Clarke Duncan as Leo Knox, a widower and former attorney.  He owns the bar "The Ends of the Earth", located on Looking Glass Key, and he also serves as Walter's manager and legal advisor, and sometimes bodyguard.  Leo is also known for his quoting of religious literature, particularly Buddhism.  He calls Walter's power "Darna Shellah" and "Akashvani".  According to Leo, he owes Walter his life.  In ep. 3, "A Cinderella Story", it is revealed that Leo lost his family (his wife Nina and teenage daughter Ellie), to E. coli poisoning.  He is based on the character "Leonard Martin" in The Knowland Retribution, the first "The Locator" book the series was based on.
 Mercedes Masöhn as Deputy U.S. Marshal Isabel Zambada.  While Walter's antics frequently get on her nerves, she and Walter have a "friends with benefits" arrangement.  Isabel has ambitions of being the first Latina United States Attorney General.  While she works as a Deputy U.S. Marshal during the day to gain field experience, she attends law school at night.  It is her intention to be "eating dinner in the White House within six years."
 Maddie Hasson as Willa Monday, a Romani juvenile delinquent.  Willa is very talented with computers, but she is prohibited from using a computer for the duration of her probation.  While Willa has been betrothed to her "cousin" Timo since she was 5 and Timo was 10, by their mutual "Uncle", Uncle Shad, the head of their family, Willa and Timo only love each other as brother and sister.  As Willa believes in true love, she wants for Timo to be able to be with the girl he loves, Magdalena.  At the end of the season, Willa goes on the run, violating her probation, in order to avoid her betrothal to Timo. They are not really cousins, it is just the Romani way to refer to one another as such, being the Romani "family".
 Toby Hemingway as Timo Proud, a Romani and Willa's "cousin".  Timo is five years older than Willa, and he has a talent for Tarot reading.  While Timo and Willa have been betrothed (by their mutual "Uncle", Uncle Shad) since she was 5 and Timo was 10, Timo is himself in love with a mutual "cousin" of theirs, Magdalena.

Development and production
Fox developed a quasi spin-off series for Bones that was built around a character introduced in the sixth season. Production on the episode featuring The Locator began in February 2011, with the episode airing in April. The series was created by Bones creator/executive producer, Hart Hanson, and based on The Locator series of two books written by Richard Greener: "The Knowland Retribution", and "The Lacey Confession". The character of Walter is an eccentric but amusing recluse in high demand for his ability to find anything. He is skeptical of everything. He suffered brain damage after surviving a roadside bomb explosion, which explains his constant paranoia and compulsion to find things—and for asking offensive, seemingly irrelevant questions to get to the truth. Production on the episode began in early 2011.

Creator Hart Hanson posted on Twitter (in a humorous manner) regarding the notes he got from the network, "I received studio notes on the Bones spin-off idea. They want it to be better. Unreasonable taskmasters. Impossible dreamers. Neo-platonists."

In the episode, the main characters of Bones travel to Key West, Florida, where The Finder is said to take place. Geoff Stults was cast as the lead character with Michael Clarke Duncan and Saffron Burrows (as Ike Latulippe, bartender and pilot) in supporting roles. The three characters were introduced in episode 19 of season 6.

The Finder was picked up for the 2011–12 season on May 10, 2011, with an order of 13 episodes. The series premiered midseason 2012, airing on Thursdays at 9:00 pm ET, occupying the Bones time slot when it is on hiatus.

Saffron Burrows did not appear beyond the backdoor pilot episode, leaving the series, because the network decided to re-conceive the role. Mercedes Masöhn and Maddie Hasson joined the cast as the two female leads. Masohn plays Isabel Zambada, a Deputy U.S. Marshal; and Hasson plays Willa, a juvenile delinquent who helps with their investigations.

Episodes

Broadcast
In Canada, the show was simsubbed against the Fox broadcast in most areas on the Global Television Network from January 12, 2012.  It premiered in New Zealand on TV3 NZ on March 22, 2012, in Australia on Network Ten
from June 25, 2012 and in the UK on the Universal Channel
on July 11, 2012 Australia's Network Ten only aired three episodes before pulling the series from the schedule, and lost broadcast rights in March 2016 without airing the remaining episodes.

The order of the episodes that aired differs from the order produced and intended. This does create some discontinuity in the events of the show, such as Timo and Leo meeting for the first time in the episode 'The Conversation', despite the two having met and conversed in previously aired episodes, or the mention of Willa not having access to the internet in the same episode, despite her probation officer allowing it two episodes before.

The series was released on Disney+ on May 20th, 2022.

The following list of episodes is the show's original order with each episode's televised order in parenthesis.

1. Pilot (#01)

2. The Last Meal (#09)

3. A Cinderella Story (#03)

4. Swing and a Miss (#04)

5. Bullets (#02)

6. The Conversation (#10)

7. The Great Escape (#05)

8. Life After Death (#08)

9. Little Green Men (#06)

10. Eye of the Storm (#07)

11. Voodoo Undo (#12)

12. The Inheritance (#11)

13. The Boy with the Bucket (#13)

See also
 The Dead Zone (TV series):  TV series about a man who gains psychic abilities during a coma after sustaining brain damage.

References

External links

 
 

Bones (TV series)
2010s American drama television series
2012 American television series debuts
2012 American television series endings
American television spin-offs
English-language television shows
Fox Broadcasting Company original programming
Television shows based on American novels
Television series by 20th Century Fox Television
Television shows set in Florida
United States Marshals Service in fiction